K17JI-D, virtual channel 12 (UHF digital channel 17), is a low-powered, Class A 3ABN-affiliated television station licensed to Fresno, California, United States. Founded November 6, 1995, the station is owned by HC2 Holdings.

History
The station began with an original construction permit granted to Rollin Wong on November 6, 1995 to build a low-power station on VHF channel 12 (as K12OZ) to serve Fresno and surrounding area. 3ABN acquired the station in June 1998 and was granted a license on October 21, 1998. The license was upgraded to Class A on March 23, 2001. On February 6, 2013, the station's license to broadcast in digital was granted, with the station moving to channel 17 and changing its call sign to K17JI-D. 3ABN sold K17JI-D and 13 other stations to HC2 Holdings for $9.6 million in 2017.

Digital channels
The station's signal is multiplexed:

References

External links 

Innovate Corp.
17JI-D
Low-power television stations in the United States
Television channels and stations established in 1998